Boyer-Ahmad County is in Kohgiluyeh and Boyer-Ahmad province, Iran. The capital of the county is the city of Yasuj. At the 2006 census, the county's population was 212,552 in 43,490 households. The following census in 2011 counted 243,771 people in 58,281 households. At the 2016 census, the county's population was 299,885 in 77,569 households, by which time Kabgian District had been separated from Dana County to join Boyer-Ahmad County. Margown District was separated from the county in 2019 to become Margown County.

Administrative divisions

The population history and structural changes of Boyer-Ahmad County's administrative divisions over three consecutive censuses are shown in the following table. The latest census shows four districts, 11 rural districts, and five cities.

References

 

Counties of Kohgiluyeh and Boyer-Ahmad Province